The mayor of Vancouver is the head and chief executive officer of Vancouver, British Columbia, who is elected for a four-year term. The 41st and current officeholder is Ken Sim, who has held office since November 7, 2022.

List 

 indicates the individual died in office.

Notes

List of mayors who held higher office 
Two former mayors, Mike Harcourt and Gordon Campbell, went on to become premier of British Columbia.

George Clark Miller, Sam Sullivan, Art Phillips and James Garden became members of the Legislative Assembly of British Columbia (MLAs) after being mayor.

Larry Campbell became a Canadian senator after being mayor.

Gregor Robertson, Charles Douglas, James Lyle Telford, Jonathan Webster Cornett and Charles Edward Tisdall were British Columbia MLAs prior to becoming mayor.

Jonathan Webster Cornett was reeve of South Vancouver before becoming Vancouver mayor.

Gerry McGeer was a BC MLA and provincial cabinet minister before becoming mayor of Vancouver and became a Canadian member of Parliament (MP) and senator after having been mayor.

Kennedy Stewart was the New Democratic Party MP for Burnaby South before being elected.

References 

Vancouver
 
Vancouver-related lists